The 1990 Kansas State Wildcats football team represented Kansas State University in the 1990 NCAA Division I-A football season.  The team's head football coach was Bill Snyder.  The Wildcats played their home games in KSU Stadium.  1990 saw the Wildcats finish with a record of 5–6, and a 2–5 record in Big Eight Conference play.

Schedule

References

Kansas State
Kansas State Wildcats football seasons
Kansas State Wildcats football